Tiziano was the leading painter of the 16th-century Venetian school of the Italian Renaissance.

Tiziano may also refer to:
 9905 Tiziano, a main belt asteroid
 Tiziano (given name), an Italian masculine given name